The Sadiq Public School (SPS) is a college-preparatory boarding school located in Bahawalpur, Punjab, Pakistan. It also takes day pupils. It is one of the largest schools in Pakistan and its area of  makes it both the largest in the country and in continental Asia.

The curriculum includes education from KG to O-level and A-level as well as local board Matriculation/Intermediate. The school has over 1400 boys and 600 girls supported by a staff of about 135.

The foundation stone of the school was laid by Nawab Sadeq Mohammad Khan V on 4 March 1953 and the school started functioning on 18 January 1954.

Organization and curriculum
Pupils in each school are divided into houses. Houses promote inter-house competitions and mentorship opportunities.

The Senior school offer four types of diplomas/certifications. One branch is School Certificate/O-level (for grades 910) and the Higher Secondary School Certificate/A-level (for grades 1112).

The other two types are Secondary School Certificate or Matriculation (for grades 910) and Higher Secondary School Certificate or Intermediate (for grades 1112).

List of houses
Kamal Pasha House-East Wing - Nursery to Grade 2 - (Junior School)
Kamal Pasha House-West Wing - Grades 3 to 5   - (Junior School)
Alamgir House-North & South Wings - Grades 6 to 8   - (Preparatory School)
Salahuddin House - Senior School Girls all grades 012 - (Senior School)
Mehmood House - Grades 9,10,11 & 12 - (Senior School)
Abbas House - Grades 9,10,11 & 12 - (Senior school)
Babar House - Grades KO1 to 5 - (Junior School)
Khalid House - Grades K01 to 5 - (Junior School)
Farid house - Grades 6,7,8 - ( preparatory school)
Shehbaz House - Grades 6,7,8 - ( preparatory school)
Iqbal house - Grades 9,10,11 and 12 - (Senior School)
Jinnah House - Grades 9,10,11 and 12 - (Senior House)
Anwar Sikander House

Principals

At the start the school had 37 children and seven teachers. Khan Anwar Sikandar Khan was Principal for over 18 years. For his services in the field of education he was decorated with Sitara-i-Khidmat. On his retirement, Abu Zafar Haneef who was the vice-principal took over, in March 1972.

The next two principals were Col (Retd) Zahoor ul Haq from 1977 to 1990 and Sqn Ldr. (Retd.) Agha Khalil Ahmad from 1990 to 2001.

Prof. Mohammad Asif Malik took over as Principal in September 2002. He is a recipient of the President's Award of Pride of Performance for services in the field of education.

Maj. (R) Syed Munir Ahmad, an Old Sadiqian, took the charge as 6th Principal of Sadiq Public School Bahawalpur in November 2007, after the departure of Prof. Mohammad Asif Malik. He was the first Principal of Sadiq Public School who was also an old Sadiqian (left school in 1966).

Prof. Dr.Saleem Raza Chaudhry took charge as 7th Principal of Sadiq Public School on the orders of Governor Punjab Sardar Latif Khosa in August 2012.

Prof. Abdullah Shah, who at the time was serving as vice-principal of Sadiq, was appointed interim-principal. The school went through a difficult period during his supervision because of the decision to increase fees (this was reversed in a lawsuit filed by parents) and there were reports of conflicts with faculty and staff members. Allegedly due to political reasons, several office holding staff members were swapped or replaced.

Prof. Nauman Ahmed Qureshi took charge as the 8th principal of Sadiq in July 2014.

In June 2017, Mian Muhammad Ahmed, the sitting vice-principal of the School, took charge as the acting principal.

In May 2019, Governor of Pujab, Chaudhry Mohammad Sarwar commissioned Peter Giddens, a New Zealander, as the principal of the institute.

Girls Section

In 1966 the admission of girls was stopped. A separate Girls' Section started in May 2003 with 9 girls and has since grown to more than 700 girls with more than 100 boarders commissioned August 2006. The new academic building for girls, donated by H.H. the Ruler of Abu Dhabi and President of UAE, was completed on July 25th, 2008 for girls classes (Class 6 to 12). Lessons for girls in the new building began on October 6th, 2008.

Information Technology Center
An IT Centre has been established adjacent to the senior school academic block. Labs are equipped with computer workstations.

Administration

Administratively, the school is governed by a Board of Governors with the Governor of the Punjab as its president. District Co-ordination Officer, Bahawalpur and Principal of the school are members of the board along with the GOC 35th Division, Bahawalpur. Six to eight Old-Sadiqians sit as members of the Board for a period of three years. The day-to-day administration is entrusted to the Principal, managed by the executive committee with the General Officer Commanding 35 Division as its chairman.

Hospital
The hospital at Sadiq Public School is fully equipped with modern machinery and with an ambulance with 24 hours services.

Facilities

Education
Boarding Houses
Science Labs
IT (Information Technology) Center
Audio visual aids
Electronic Lab
Libraries
Amphitheater
Sports
Swimming pools
Squash courts
Tennis courts
Badminton courts
Basketball courts
Volleyball courts
Gymnasium
Sports fields
General
Guest houses for parents/wards
Mosque
Hospital (with ambulance service)
Canteen, general store, tailor shops, shoe store, Post Office, ice-cream/drinks parlor, bakery, fruit shop
Telephone exchange (EPABX)
Auditorium

Notable alumni

As of January 18, 2004, some 30 old-students of the School were sitting in the Senate, National and Provincial Assemblies.

SADIQ has provided sitting Chairman of the Senate, Gen. Mateen Ahmed (Tamgh-e-Jurat, Medal of Honour) Chief Minister of Sindh, Federal and Provincial ministers, two serving Lieutenant Generals, four serving ambassadors, bureaucrats, industrialists, scientists and two former national cricket team captains namely Rameez Raja and Waqar Younis.

Notable alumni include:
&Imran Khan, Prime Minister of Pakistan
Moazzam Jah Ansari, PSP, QPM, UNPM, NSC, Inspector General of Frontier Constabulary 
Haji Muhammmed Aslam Khan Khichi 
Makhdoom Shahabuddin
Muhammad Mian Soomro, former President, Prime Minister and Chairman of Senate of Pakistan and former Governor of Sindh
Jehangir Khan Tareen, former Federal Minister for Industries and Production
Tariq Bashir Cheema, Former Federal Minister for Housing
Zaka Ashraf, former Chairman Pakistan Cricket Board
Salahuddin Quader Chowdhury, Former Minister, Bangladesh
Siddiq Khan Kanju, former Minister of State for Foreign Affairs (Pakistan)
Syed Ali Raza, Former Chairman & President National Bank of Pakistan
Ishaq Khan Khakwani, former State Minister for Railways
Waqar Younis, former captain Pakistan Cricket Team
Rameez Raja, cricket commentator, former batsman of Pakistan Cricket Team, former Chairman of Pakistan Cricket Board
Makhdoom Altaf Ahmed Hashmi Late, Former Senior Minister Provincial Assembly of the Punjab
Shafqat Mahmood Federal Minister

See also
Lawrence College Ghora Gali
Cadet College Hasanabdal
Cadet College Ghotki
Chand Bagh School Muridke
Divisional Public School & College Faisalabad

References

External links
 official website

Boarding schools in Pakistan
Academic institutions in Pakistan
Tourist attractions in Bahawalpur
Schools in Bahawalpur
Educational institutions established in 1953
1953 establishments in Pakistan